

References

     

Chemical data pages
Chemical data pages cleanup